Beiyunhexi is a station on Line 6 of the Beijing Subway. The construction of this station began on September 20, 2012, and was completed in 2014.  This station is located in Tongzhou District, Beijing on the western shore of the Grand Canal.

Station Layout 
The station has an underground island platform.

Exits 
There are 2 exits, lettered A and B. Exit A is accessible.

References

External links

Beijing Subway stations in Tongzhou District
Railway stations in China opened in 2014